William Robert Hamilton (born 9 May 1957 in Gilnahirk, County Down) is a former Northern Ireland international footballer who played as a forward.

Club career
At club level, Hamilton played for Linfield, QPR, Burnley, Oxford United, Limerick, Sligo Rovers, Coleraine and Distillery.

He joined Distillery as Player/Manager in December 1989, after leaving Limerick City of the League of Ireland Premier Division, having managed them to a third-place finish in the 1988–89 season. He made his playing debut for the Whites on 22 March 1990 and in his three seasons made 72 appearances and scored 33 goals including one hat-trick.

International career
Hamilton is best remembered by Northern Ireland fans as the man who crossed the ball for Gerry Armstrong to score for Northern Ireland in their famous win against the hosts Spain at the 1982 FIFA World Cup. He played in every game and scored two goals in the second-round game against Austria, and also played at the 1986 World Cup. He also twice won the Home Internationals in 1980 and 1984, scoring the winner against Scotland in the 1980 competition. Northern Ireland never lost when Hamilton scored. In total, Hamilton played 41 games for his country, scoring five goals.

Management and coaching
Knee injuries forced Hamilton to end his playing career in February 1992, but he continued to manage Distillery until February 1995. He guided the club to the Gold Cup victory in the 1993/94 season.

Personal life
Hamilton has the distinction of designing a board game, Billy Hamilton's Football Academy, which was released in 1985.

International goals

Scores and results list Northern Ireland's goal tally first

References

External links

Further reading
 

1957 births
Living people
Association football forwards
Association footballers from Belfast
Association footballers from Northern Ireland
Expatriate association footballers from Northern Ireland
Northern Ireland international footballers
Queens Park Rangers F.C. players
Burnley F.C. players
Oxford United F.C. players
Linfield F.C. players
Lisburn Distillery F.C. players
Lisburn Distillery F.C. managers
1982 FIFA World Cup players
1986 FIFA World Cup players
Limerick F.C. players
Limerick F.C. managers
Sligo Rovers F.C. players
Expatriate association footballers in the Republic of Ireland
League of Ireland managers
League of Ireland players
NIFL Premiership players
English Football League players
Burnley F.C. non-playing staff
Football managers from Northern Ireland